Rudum District is a district of the Shabwah Governorate, Yemen. As of 2003, the district had a population of 23,244 inhabitants.

References

Districts of Shabwah Governorate